Elizabeth Danielyan  (Armenian: Էլիզաբեթ Դանիելյան, born 7 March 2003), better known as simply Betty (Armenian: Բեթթի), is an Armenian singer. She represented Armenia in the Junior Eurovision Song Contest 2014 in Malta with her song "People of the Sun".

Besides her native Armenian, Betty also speaks Russian and English.

Early life
Elizabeth Danielyan was born on 7 March 2003. Her birth was the greatest gift for her mother on women's international day. Being an active and musical child, she attended State Choreographical School since the age of 4 and simultaneously attended college. She went to School N.8 named after A.Pushkin since the age of 6 where she had excellent progress. She attended professional singing classes, individual dancing classes. Betty authored many songs and poems, she also plays guitar and drums. In addition to this, Elizabeth attended the National Aesthetical Centre named after Henrik Igityan, where she studied embroidery, origami and drawing, pottery.

Career
Since August 2012 Betty hosted “The Magnificent Seven with Elizabeth” on “Kentron” TV and “Alone at home” on “H2” TV. Betty had experience in hosting from TV broadcasting since her early age for she had often many appearances in “Hayrenik” TV channel broadcasting. Betty also received an offer from the most famous Armenian music channel 21TV to host the program "Betty Show". Betty loves to host those programs and to take part in those projects and events (TV programs, concerts, charity events) in which there is beauty, knowledge kind goals, high quality.

2012 was an abundant year for Betty not only in terms of TV broadcasting, but also concerts. As a guest she also participated in “Junior New Wave” international contest.  Elizabeth won many prizes in different contests: "Kangoroo" mathematical contest. In summer of 2012 Betty took part in Junior Sports Olympiad which took place in Antalia, and brought with her to Armenia 4 golden medals (winning her competitors in mini golf, dart and jenga)

In 2013 Betty submitted an application for participation in "New Wave Junior" annual song contest and qualified for semifinal (Moscow).
In 2013 Elizabeth Danielyan was named as  "The Best Armenian Junior TV host" from Armenian Public  Radio and TV.

In 2014 Betty decided to submit an application for participating Armenian national selection of Junior Eurovision. From 87 participants Betty won the trip to Malta. Betty represented Armenia In Junior Eurovision 2014 and ended 3rd with only 1 point less from 2nd place's participant.

In 2014 from Annual National Junior Music Award Betty received a special prize for Representing Armenia in Junior Eurovision.

Social media 
 Facebook 
 Instagram
 Twitter
 SoundCloud
 Youtube

References

http://betty.am/about.php

2003 births
21st-century Armenian women singers
Armenian child singers
Junior Eurovision Song Contest entrants for Armenia
Living people
Armenian pop singers